Appleby is a small village and civil parish in North Lincolnshire, England.

In 1086 it had a recorded population of 26 households, putting it in the largest 40 % of settlements recorded in Domesday (NB: 26 households is an estimate, since multiple places are mentioned in the same entry), and is listed under three owners in Domesday Book.

Returns in the 2001 Census show an Appleby parish population of 597, reducing slightly to 587 at the 2011 census.

The Appleby logboat is a Bronze Age logboat, found during dredging of the old River Acholme near Appleby in 1943.

References

External links
 
 Appleby web site
 

Villages in the Borough of North Lincolnshire
Civil parishes in Lincolnshire